4-Methylcatechol is a chemical compound. It is a component of castoreum, the exudate from the castor sacs of the mature beaver.

Metabolism 
The enzyme cis-1,2-dihydroxy-4-methylcyclohexa-3,5-diene-1-carboxylate dehydrogenase uses cis-1,2-dihydroxy-4-methylcyclohexa-3,5-diene-1-carboxylate and NAD(P)+ to produce 4-methylcatechol, NADH, NADPH and CO2.

Related compounds 
Members of the monocot subfamily Amaryllidoideae present a unique type of alkaloids, the norbelladine alkaloids, which are 4-methylcatechol derivatives combined with tyrosine. They are responsible for the poisonous properties of a number of the species.

Production 
The brand of low-temperature coke used as a smokeless fuel Coalite obtains homocatechol from ammoniacal liquor by solvent extraction, distillation and crystallisation.

See also 
 Dihydroxytoluene

References 

Natural phenols
Catechols